Horst Hörnlein (aka Horst Hömlein, born 31 May 1945 in Möhrenbach) is a former East German luger and bobsleigh coach who competed in the late 1960s and early 1970s. He and Reinhard Bredow won the gold medal in the men's doubles event (shared with the Italians Paul Hildgartner and Walter Plaikner) at the 1972 Winter Olympics in Sapporo.

Hörnlein also won five medals in the men's doubles event at the FIL World Luge Championships with one gold (1973), one silver (1969), and three bronzes (1965, 1970, 1971). He won four medals at the FIL European Luge Championships with three golds (Men's singles: 1971, Men's doubles: 1970, 1972) and one bronze (Men's singles: 1970).

After his retirement from competition, he became a bobsleigh coach, training the East German team from 1973 to 1990, and later coaching the British and Irish teams. He also served as head of the International Bobsleigh and Skeleton Federation's bobsleigh development programme, working with bobsledders from developing countries.

References

SportQuick.com information on Hörnlein 

1945 births
Living people
People from Ilm-Kreis
Free German Youth members
German male lugers
Sportspeople from Thuringia
Lugers at the 1968 Winter Olympics
Lugers at the 1972 Winter Olympics
Olympic medalists in luge
Medalists at the 1972 Winter Olympics
Olympic gold medalists for East Germany
Recipients of the Patriotic Order of Merit in gold
Recipients of the Banner of Labor
East German sports coaches